Antaeotricha humerella is a moth of the family Depressariidae. It is found in Brazil (Amazonas), French Guiana, Guyana and Panama.

The wingspan is about 24 mm. The forewings are violet-brownish-ochreous, towards the costa yellower-tinged and with a violet-brown line along the costa throughout, from one-third to four-fifths, edged beneath with some slender obscure violet-whitish suffusion. The first discal stigma is dark fuscous, the second hardly infuscated. The hindwings are grey, the apical fifth suffused with ochreous-yellow.

References

Moths described in 1864
humerella
Moths of Central America
Moths of South America